Botobolar is a vineyard in Mudgee in the Central West of New South Wales in Australia.  It was the first fully certified organic vineyard in Australia and was established in 1971.  Botobolar was the family vineyard of Gilbert ("Gil") and Vincie Wahlquist. Åsa Wahlquist has also worked at Botobolar as a winemaker.

See also
New South Wales wine

References

External links
Botobolar homepage
Gilbert Wahlquist's homepage

Wineries in New South Wales
Vineyards
Australian companies established in 1971
Food and drink companies established in 1971